Challa Venkatrami Reddy is a politician in Alampur, Mahbubnagar, Telangana, India. He was an independent MLA for Alampur Constituency from 2004 to 2009. He supported the Congress government in the state led by Dr Y.S Rajashekar Reddy. He is the grandson of Dr Neelam Sanjeeva Reddy, former president of India.  After Alampur got reserved for Scheduled Castes (SC),  he supported Dr. Abraham (Congress) who won the election with  his support in  2009. In the 2014 election, he supported Dr. Sampath Kumar (Congress), who is the present Member of Legislative Assembly (MLA) for Alampur, Telangana.

Reddy was born at Hyderabad.
He is son of Challa Rambhupal Reddy.

Political career
 Village President for Pullur, Alampur, Telangana. 2002-2004
 MLA from 2004 to 2009 (Alampur)

References

External links
 Facebook page

Living people
Members of the Andhra Pradesh Legislative Assembly
Year of birth missing (living people)